The 1980 Silverstone 6 Hours, was the fifth round of both the World Championship for Makes and FIA World Challenge for Endurance Drivers, and was held at the Silverstone Grand Prix circuit, on 11 May.

Report

Entry
A total of 40 cars were entered for the event, across eight classes ranging through Group 2 up to Group 6. Of these 31 cars practised.

Qualifying
The Porsche 935 K3 of Porsche Kermer Racing, driven by John Fitzpatrick, partnered by Guy Edwards and Axel Plankenhorn took pole position. They were joined on the front row by the André Chavalley Racing’s ACR-Cosworth 80 of Patrick Gaillard, André Chevalley and Francois Trisconi.

Race
The race was held for 6 Hours, on Silverstone’s Grand Prix circuit, a distance of 1,106.6 km. Alain de Cadenet and Desiré Wilson took the winner spoils for the second round in a fortnight, for the de Cadenet team, driving their De Cadenet Lola-Cosworth LM1. The pair won in a time of 6hr 00:00.000mins., averaging a speed of 114.602ph. Whilst Wilson was driving, she lost the lead when she locked the brakes and was penalised one lap for missing the Woodcote chicane, but she produced a strong drive in spite of a misfire, to retake the lead 25 minutes remaining.
In Italy, de Cadenet and Wilson had beaten Jürgen Barth and Henri Pescarolo in a Porsche 935K3. At Silverstone, Barth was second again, but this time sharing Siegfried Brunn’s amazing Porsche 908/3. Third but so nearly a late retirement, was the Porsche 935 of John Paul, Sr. and Brian Redman. Riccardo Patrese’s work Lancia Montecarlo crashed early in the race when its suspension broke up. But the sister car of Walter Röhrl and Michele Alboreto, streamed onto a class winning fourth place. The race was initially dominated by a brand new Kremer Porsche, destined for Le Mans and driven by pole-man Fitzpatrick, joined by Edwards and Plankenhorn. Unfortunately, the car retired.

Classification

Silverstone 6 Hours

Class Winners are in Bold text.

Note: Class winners in bold

 Fastest lap: Porsche Kremer Racing #19, 1:25.53secs. (124.13 mph)

References

Silverstone 6 Hours
World Sportscar Championship races
FIA World Challenge for Endurance Drivers
Silverstone 6 Hours